A temporary resident is a foreign national granted the right to stay in a country for a certain length of time (e.g. with a visa or ), without full citizenship. This may be for study, business, or other reasons.

Various countries have their own rules or policies relating to temporary residency:-

 North America
 Temporary residency in the United States
 Temporary residency in Canada
 South America
 Temporary Residency in Brazil
 Asia:
 Temporary residency in China
 European Union:
 German residence permit
 Temporary residency in the Czech Republic
 Temporary residency in Poland
 Temporary residency in Estonia
Temporary residency in Lithuania
 Portugal Golden Visa
Other
 Temporary residency in Australia
 Temporary residency in South Africa

See also 
 Travel visa
 Immigration
 Permanent resident
 Nationality law
 Expatriate
 Right of asylum
 Foreign worker

References

Human migration
Immigration law